Alin Artimon (born 19 February 1992) is a Romanian swimmer. He competed in the men's 400 metre freestyle event at the 2017 World Aquatics Championships.

References

1992 births
Living people
Romanian male freestyle swimmers
Place of birth missing (living people)